Paidi Jairaj (born 28 September 1909 – 11 August 2000) was an Indian actor, director and producer known for his works majorly in Hindi; few Marathi, Gujarati, Telugu language films, and Telugu theatre. During the talkie period, from 1931 onwards, he started with Shikari in Urdu and English languages. Subsequently, he became one of the leading actors for about two decades, along with V. Shantaram, Ashok Kumar, Prithviraj Kapoor, Motilal etc. He starred in about 170 feature films in a variety of roles. He directed a few films such as Mohar, Mala (1943), Pratima, Rajghar and Saagar (1951), which he produced. In 1980, he was awarded with the Dadasaheb Phalke Award, the highest award for films in India, for his contributions to Indian cinema.

Early life
Jairaj was born in Sircilla of Hyderabad State (present-day Telangana) on 28 September 1909. He had two brothers - Paidi Sundararaja, Paidi Deendayal (Artist) and Paidi Jairaj was the youngest.

Career
Jairaj developed an interest in theatre and films during his graduate studies at Nizam College, and left for Bombay in 1929. He made his acting debut in 1929 with the silent film Star Kling Youth, and subsequently he acted in about eleven silent films including Triangle of Love, Mathru Bhoomi, All for Lover, Mahasagar Mothi, Flight into Death, My Hero etc.

He played the characters of Amar Singh Rathore [1957], Prithviraj Chauhan [1959], and Maharana Pratap [1960] among notable films. He also essayed the roles of Shah Jahan [1947], Tipu Sultan [1959] and Haider Ali [1962]. His other portrayals have been in films such as Sassi Punnu [1947], Hatimtai [1956], Chandrashekar Azad [1963] and Durga Das [1964] among others. Jairaj did six films with Suraiya in the 1940s and 1950s, five of them, viz. Humaari Baat (1943), Singaar (1949), Amar Kahani (1949), Rajput (1951) and Resham (1952) as her hero, and one of them, Lal Kunwar (1952), as second lead. In 1952, he produced and directed his own film Sagar, which was not well received by the audiences, but he was still committed to cinema.

Personal life
He married a Punjabi woman, Savitri, from Delhi. It was an arranged marriage. Prithviraj Kapoor's father had chosen the bride for him. He had two sons and three daughters. His wife died a year before him of cancer. His daughter Geeta Gupta looked after him in his last years. Rajan Shahi, TV producer-director, is his daughter's son (maternal grandson), the sole person of Jairaj's extended family in Bollywood. Jairaj died in Mumbai on 11 August 2000.

Popular culture
A one-hour documentary, Life journey of Jairaj, was made by the Government of Telangana in 2018 to celebrate his life.

Awards
National Film Awards
Dadasaheb Phalke Award - 1980

Filmography

Actor

Director

References

External links

 Talkie Star from the Silent Era(by B. Sumangal)

Telugu people
Male actors in Hindi cinema
Hindi-language film directors
1909 births
2000 deaths
Dadasaheb Phalke Award recipients
20th-century Indian film directors
Indian male film actors
20th-century Indian male actors
Indian male stage actors
Male actors in Telugu cinema
Male actors in Gujarati-language films
Male actors in Marathi cinema
Male actors from Telangana
Film directors from Telangana